Port of Portland Police may refer to two police forces:

Port of Portland Police (United Kingdom), Isle of Portland, United Kingdom
Port of Portland Police Department (Oregon), Portland, Oregon, United States